Lika-Krbava County was a historic administrative subdivision of the Kingdom of Croatia-Slavonia. Croatia-Slavonia was an autonomous kingdom within the Lands of the Crown of Saint Stephen, the Hungarian part of the dual Austro-Hungarian Empire. Its territory is now in southwestern Croatia. Lika and Krbava are the names of two valleys in the county (Gospić lies in Lika). The capital of the county was Gospić (Croatian, in Hungarian: Goszpics).

Geography
Lika-Krbava county shared borders with the Austrian Kingdom of Dalmatia and Bosnia-Herzegovina and the county of Modruš-Rijeka (also in Croatia-Slavonia). The county has a strip of Adriatic Sea coast. Its area was 6211 km2 around 1910.

History
The territory of the Lika-Krbava County was part of the Kingdom of Croatia when it entered a personal union with the Kingdom of Hungary in 1102, and with it became part of the Habsburg monarchy in 1526. In 1920, by the Treaty of Trianon the county became part of the newly formed Kingdom of Serbs, Croats and Slovenes (later renamed to Yugoslavia). Since 1991, when Croatia became independent from Yugoslavia, the county is part of Croatia.

Demographics
In 1900, the county had a population of 209,341 people and was composed of the following linguistic communities:

Total:

 Serbian: 107,172 (51.2%)
 Croatian: 101,737 (48.6%)
 German: 134 (0.0%)
 Hungarian: 60 (0.0%)
 Slovak: 10 (0.0%)
 Romanian: 1 (0.0%)
 Ruthenian: 0 (0.0%)
 Other or unknown: 227 (0.1%)

According to the census of 1900, the county was composed of the following religious communities:

Total:

 Serbian Orthodox: 107,176 (51.2%)
 Roman Catholic: 102,123 (48.8%)
 Lutheran: 16 (0.0%)
 Calvinist: 11 (0.0%)
 Greek Catholic: 7 (0.0%)
 Jewish: 7 (0.0%)
 Unitarian: 0 (0.0%)
 Other or unknown: 1 (0.0%)

In 1910, the county had a population of 204,710 people and was composed of the following linguistic communities:

Total:

 Serbian: 104,036 (50.82%)
 Croatian: 100,346 (49.02%)
 German: 68 (0.03%)
 Hungarian: 22 (0.01%)
 Slovak: 3 (0.0%)
 Romanian: 2 (0.0%)
 Ruthenian: 2 (0.0%)
 Other or unknown: 231 (0.11%)

According to the census of 1910, the county was composed of the following religious communities:

Total:

 Serbian Orthodox: 104,041 (50.82%)
 Roman Catholic: 100,620 (49.15%)
 Lutheran: 6 (0.0%)
 Calvinist: 2 (0.0%)
 Greek Catholic: 14 (0.0%)
 Jewish: 12 (0.0%)
 Unitarian: 0 (0.0%)
 Other or unknown: 15 (0.0%)

Subdivisions
In the early 20th century, the subdivisions of Lika-Krbava County were:

See also

Lika-Senj County of Croatia

References

 
1920 disestablishments
Former counties of Croatia
Counties in the Kingdom of Hungary
States and territories established in the 12th century
History of Lika